Tsargrad is a Slavic name for the city or land of Constantinople (present-day Istanbul in Turkey), the capital of the Byzantine Empire. It is rendered in several ways depending on the language, for instance Old Church Slavonic Цѣсарьградъ; Church Slavonic; Царьгра̀дъ, ; South Slavic languages:  Carigrad or Цариград, depending on their alphabets (or Tsarigrad as an alternative Latin transliteration of Cyrillic); ; ; ; ; also Czargrad and Tzargrad; see: Tsar.

Tsargrad is an Old Church Slavonic translation of the Greek Βασιλὶς Πόλις. Combining the Slavonic words tsar for "caesar / emperor" and grad for "city", it meant "imperial city". According to Per Thomsen, the Old Russian form influenced an Old Norse appellation of Constantinople, Miklagard (Мikligarðr).

Bulgarians also applied the word to Tarnovgrad (Tsarevgrad Tarnov, "Imperial City of Tarnov"), one of the capitals of the tsars of the Bulgarian Empire, but after the Balkans fell under Ottoman rule, the Bulgarian word has been used exclusively as another name of Constantinople.

After the fall of Constantinople in 1453, the burgeoning Grand Duchy of Moscow began to see itself as the last extension of the Roman Empire, and the force that would resurrect the lost leviathan (Third Rome). This belief was the supported by the Russian Orthodox Church and given at least an air of legitimacy by the marriage of Ivan III to Sophia Palaiologina, a relative of the last Byzantine Emperor. It was allegedly an objective of the Tsars to recapture the city, but despite many southern advances and expansion by the empire, this was never realized. In August 1829, a Russian army did reach nearby Adrianople.

As the zeitgeist which spawned the term has faded, the word Tsargrad is now an archaic term in Russian. It is however still used occasionally in Bulgarian, particularly in a historical context. A major traffic artery in Bulgaria's capital Sofia carries the name Tsarigradsko shose ("Tsarigrad Road"); the road begins as the Tsar Osvoboditel Boulevard and continues into the main highway that leads southeast to Istanbul. The name Tsarigrad is also retained in word groups such as tsarigradsko grozde ("Tsarigrad grapes", meaning "gooseberry"), the dish tsarigradski kyuftentsa ("small Tsarigrad koftas") or sayings like "One can even get to Tsarigrad by asking". In Slovene it is still largely used and often preferred over the official name. People also understand and sometimes use the name Carigrad in Bosnia, Croatia, North Macedonia, Montenegro and Serbia.

The Romance language Romanian borrowed the term as Țarigrad, but it is an archaic usage now that has been replaced by Constantinopol and Istanbul. Nowadays, a village in Moldova is called Țarigrad.

Footnotes

Bulgarian words and phrases
Constantinople

bg:Истанбул (имена)#Цариград